Juan Ramón Verón (born 17 March 1944) is an Argentine football coach and former professional player. He played as a midfielder or forward most notably for Estudiantes, where he won three consecutive Copa Libertadores titles. He is the father of former player Juan Sebastián Verón.

Career

Estudiantes
Nicknamed La Bruja , Juan Ramón Verón was born in La Plata. He was capable of playing both as a midfielder and as a striker, and was renowned for his technical skills, ability with the ball at his feet and his goal-scoring prowess. He played for Estudiantes de La Plata, who were a dominant force in Argentine football during the late 1960s.

Among the memorable goals he scored are his "bicycle kick" goal against Racing Club, his header in the Intercontinental Cup championship against Manchester United and, most famously, his glorious hat-trick against Brazil's Palmeiras in the finals of the 1968 Copa Libertadores.

Later years
Known as one of Estudiantes' all-time great players, he moved on to play for Panathinaikos F.C. of Athens, Greece in 1972. After a successful  seasons he returned to his beloved Estudiantes in 1975.

In 1976, he moved to Colombia where he played for Atlético Junior where he helped the team to win the 1977 Colombian title and then Cúcuta Deportivo before returning to his home club in 1980.

After retirement
After retiring, he had a brief career as coach in Central America and is now working as a special advisor for Estudiantes.

Personal life
His son, nicknamed La Brujita (The Little Witch), Juan Sebastián Verón, is also a footballer, who played for Estudiantes before moving to European football. In 2006, he returned to Estudiantes to captain them to their first title in 23 years in the Apertura 2006 tournament. In 2017, he came out of retirement to play for Estudiantes once again.

Honours
Estudiantes
Primera División Argentina: Metropolitano 1967
Copa Libertadores: 1968, 1969, 1970
Intercontinental Cup: 1968

Atlético Junior
Colombian League: 1977

References

External links

 
 
 
 Veron playing for Argentina national team
  
  

1944 births
Living people
Footballers from La Plata
Argentine footballers
Association football forwards
Association football midfielders
Argentina international footballers
Estudiantes de La Plata footballers
Argentine Primera División players
Super League Greece players
Panathinaikos F.C. players
Atlético Junior footballers
Cúcuta Deportivo footballers
Copa Libertadores-winning players
Argentine football managers
Guatemala national football team managers
Comunicaciones F.C. managers
Argentine expatriate footballers
Argentine expatriate football managers
Argentine expatriate sportspeople in Greece
Expatriate footballers in Greece
Argentine expatriate sportspeople in Colombia
Expatriate footballers in Colombia
Argentine expatriate sportspeople in Guatemala
Expatriate football managers in Guatemala
Verón/Verde family
Atlético Junior managers